Point Blanc is the second book in the Alex Rider series, written by British author Anthony Horowitz. The book was released in the United Kingdom on September 3, 2001 and in North America on April 15, 2002, under the alternate title Point Blank.

In 2003, the novel was listed on the BBC's survey The Big Read. In 2007, it was adapted into a graphic novel, written by Antony Johnston and illustrated by Kanako Damerum and Yuzuru Takasaki, and in 2020 served as the basis of the first season of the Amazon Prime Video series Alex Rider, starring Otto Farrant as Rider.

Plot summary
The book opens with the death of American electronics billionaire Michael J. Roscoe, in an elevator shaft in his New York City office, arranged by a reputable contract killer. Elsewhere, Alex Rider is at school and witnesses a man known as "Skoda" selling drugs to some of his classmates. Alex follows him to his home, situated on a barge in Putney River, but is caught by the police after using a crane to lift the barge out of the water. He accidentally drops it in a police conference centre rather than a nearby car park, as he originally intended, thanks to the builders shutting down the crane's power. The police arrest Skoda and his accomplice, Mike Beckett.

Miraculously, no one is killed, although some people end up with major injuries, but Alex's real identity is revealed when he is arrested. After arranging for his release, MI6 chief Alan Blunt blackmails Alex into investigating the deaths of Roscoe and General Viktor Ivanov, head of the Foreign Intelligence Service, who died in a bizarre motorboat explosion, in exchange for all potential charges being dropped. The only thing linking these deaths are that both men had rebellious sons attending the Point Blanc Academy in the French Alps.

Alex undergoes a dramatic physical change and takes the identity of Alex Friend, supposedly the rebellious son of supermarket billionaire Sir David Friend. He stays with the family (Sir David, his wife Lady Caroline, and their snooty daughter Fiona) for a week in preparation for his infiltration of the academy. Fiona does not take well to having Alex staying with them and arranges for her 'boyfriend' Rufus and his friends to kill Alex during a shooting party in the forest; Alex gets his own back on Rufus, by frightening him and throwing his illegal gun into a pond. Alex later meets MI6 gadget-master Smithers, and receives a bulletproof ski suit, infrared ski goggles, an exploding earring, a diamond-edged buzzsaw and distress beacon disguised as a Sony Discman, and a hardback book with a tranquilizer dart that shoots out of the spine.

He is picked up by assistant director Mrs Eva Stellenbosch, who takes him to the Du Monde hotel in Paris. That night, the Coke he drinks at dinner is drugged; when he passes out in his room, he is transported via a giant lift to the hotel's basement, where plastic surgeon Dr Walter Baxter has Alex stripped completely naked, every inch of his body being meticulously photographed, measured and examined for unknown reasons at this point in the plot. Afterwards, his clothes are put back on him and he is returned to his room as though nothing happened.

Alex arrives at the academy the next day and meets the director, Dr Hugo Grief, who he instantly dislikes. He later strikes a friendship with James Sprintz, another pupil at the academy who is asked to show Alex around. James explains that something weird is happening in the academy; the other five rebellious, disrespectful students each underwent a sudden overnight change and become the seemingly "perfect" pupils they seem to be now. James wants to escape, confiding in Alex about his plot to ski down the mountain and go to either his father in Düsseldorf, his mother in England or friends in Paris and Berlin if neither of his parents want him. Alex investigates over a number of days, and one night after sneaking out, sees James being dragged from his room by two guards led by Mrs Stellenbosch. The next morning, James acts strangely, having seemingly become just like the others, and has abandoned his escape plan. Realising that he was telling the truth, Alex investigates further, discovering that the academy's top two floors are largely copies of the ground and first floors, before returning to his own room and contacting MI6 via the Discman distress beacon.

Blunt and Mrs Jones argue over what to do when they receive Alex's signal. They eventually decide to put a unit on standby, to take action the following day, whilst Alex searches the academy’s basement (which can only be accessed via a hidden lift whose ground floor entrance is hidden by a suit of armour in the library). He discovers the basement is a jail, where he finds James, Michael J. Roscoe's son Paul, and all the other students, who explain that Grief has made clones of them. Alex goes to leave to bring help, but Stellenbosch knocks him unconscious before he can.

Grief, a former Minister of Science and BOSS officer, explains to Alex his plan to take over the world, codenamed "the Gemini Project". In the 1990s, disgusted with the rise Nelson Mandela and black rule in his native South Africa, he made sixteen clones of himself, and had used the late Baxter (who Alex saw Grief kill) to alter their appearances to resemble the sons of rich and influential people, as a means to eventually have his clones inherit the assets of these individuals and allow Grief to take over the world, as the families in question are leaders in every corner of human activity, including diamond mining, food, the military, financing, politics, and the media. He adds that Michael J. Roscoe and Viktor Ivanov were both killed for suspecting that their "sons" were acting abnormally.

Grief then tells Alex of his eventual fate: he will be killed the next morning through a live dissection, and imprisons him in the basement. Alex, using his exploding earring, escapes and snowboards down the mountain the academy is situated on using an improvised ironing board. While escaping pursuing two guards on snowmobiles, Alex is hospitalized when the force of a nearby train throws him into a fence.

Alex is hospitalised in Grenoble, but Mrs Stellenbosch, who arrives there after being tipped off by a guard, is told that he is dead. She then watches as an honour guard from the French Army carry a Union flag-laden coffin onto a C-130 Hercules, which apparently flies to London for Alex's military funeral. However, this was merely a decoy, and Alex is revealed to be still alive, the SAS having rescued him. Mrs Jones convinces him to return to the academy with an SAS squad, led by his former training partner "Wolf", in order to rescue the students.

While storming the school, Alex is attacked by Stellenbosch, who is shot dead by Wolf just before she can kill Alex. However, Wolf is also shot in the process (though not fatally), and Alex rushes out of the building in anger to see Dr Grief about to leave via helicopter. In a desperate bid to stop him, Alex uses a snowmobile to drive forward and smash into the helicopter, leaping off just before they make contact. Grief is killed when the snowmobile collides with his helicopter, causing an explosion.

Alex returns home, where Mrs Jones tells Alex in a debriefing that the rescue mission was a success and that "all fifteen clones" have been apprehended. Alex then receives a call informing him to visit Mr Bray, the head teacher at his school. However, after finding a clone of himself in Bray's office, he recalls Mrs Jones’ words (as well as those of Grief, Jack, and Mr Lee the school caretaker) and realises that one clone – his own – had escaped from justice. Alex then fights his clone in the school, with their battle eventually causing a fire after an incident in the science block, and one of the two falls into the burning school from the roof, whilst the other is rescued. It is left ambiguous which Alex survives.

Critical reception
Reviewer Chris High said, "For first class spills, thrills, and adventure, Anthony Horowitz can be safely said to have cornered the modern market...influenced greatly by Ian Fleming's work." Read Hot calls it a "must read for all teenagers". The School Library Journal says, "Spy gadgets, chase scenes, mysteries, and a cliff-hanger ending will keep even reluctant readers interested in the second novel in this series." Booklist also says that Point Blanc is a great read for any reluctant teenager ready for a thrilling spy adventure.

Adaptation
In July 2018, it was announced that Eleventh Hour Films would be collaborating with Sony Pictures Television to produce an eight-episode adaptation of Point Blanc as part of their upcoming Alex Rider television series. In late September 2019, Andreas Prochaska was announced as the director with Otto Farrant starring as Alex Rider.

Awards
Shortlisted for the 2002 Children’s Book Award.
Winner of the 2004 Children's Book Awards.

See also

References

Alex Rider novels
2001 British novels
Apartheid in fiction
Novels about cloning
British novels adapted into television shows
Novels set in London
Novels set in France
2001 children's books
Walker Books books